Molashiyeh-ye Seh (also Romanized as Molāshīyeh-ye Seh) is a village in Esmailiyeh Rural District, Central District, Ahvaz County, Khuzestan Province, Iran. At the 2006 census, its population was 265, in 45 families.

References 

Populated places in Ahvaz County